In These Times, released by Rhino Records (Warner Bros. Records) in 2004 is Peter, Paul & Mary's final studio album. The album has 12 new recordings with originals and selections by Pete Seeger, Anne Feeney, Gene Nelson, and other music artists.  Several of the songs have a social justice theme.  Giving it 4 out of 5 stars, Allmusic called the album "reassuring and refreshing".

Track listing
"Union Medley: You Gotta Go Down and Join the Union/Put It on the Ground/Union Maid/We Shall Not Be Moved/Which Side Are You On?"
"Have You Been to Jail for Justice?"
"Jesus Is on the Wire"
"Don't Laugh at Me"
"Wayfaring Stranger"
"How Can I Keep from Singing?/The Great Storm Is Over"
"Invisible People"
"Of This World"
"Some Walls"
"All God's Critters"
"It's Magic"
"Oh, Had I a Golden Thread"

Personnel
Peter Yarrow – vocals, guitar
Noel "Paul" Stookey – vocals, guitar
Mary Travers – vocals
Paul Prestopino – guitar, banjo, dobro, mandolin, harmonica
Richard Kniss – bass

References

External links
In These Times (Peter, Paul, and Mary homepage)

2003 albums
Peter, Paul and Mary albums
Warner Records albums
Rhino Records albums